The Rat Root River is a river of Minnesota. It flows into the Rainy River.

Rat Root River was named for roots eaten by muskrats.

See also
List of rivers of Minnesota

References

Minnesota Watersheds
USGS Geographic Names Information Service
USGS Hydrologic Unit Map - State of Minnesota (1974)

Rivers of Koochiching County, Minnesota
Rivers of St. Louis County, Minnesota
Rivers of Minnesota